Hatne is a selo in Fastiv Raion in Kyiv Oblast of northern Ukraine. It hosts the administration of Hatne rural hromada, one of the hromadas of Ukraine.

History 
The village was established in 1169.

Until 18 July 2020, Hatne belonged to Kyiv-Sviatoshyn Raion. The raion was abolished that day as part of the administrative reform of Ukraine, which reduced the number of raions of Kyiv Oblast to seven. The area of Kyiv-Sviatoshyn Raion was split between Bucha, Fastiv, and Obukhiv Raions, with Hatne being transferred to Fastiv Raion.

Geography 
It has a population of about 3077 people.

References

Villages in Fastiv Raion